Paul Manta, (born in Bucharest, 2 June 1943), is a Romanian former football goalkeeper, who played for Sportul Studenţesc, Universitatea Craiova and Progresul București.

Football career

Early career
Manta was born in the Cotroceni residential area of Bucharest. Firstly he was interested in athletics (high jump and pole-vault) and he trained in the stadium located in Dr. Staicovici Street. One day, the students from the Institute of Physical Education and Sports did not have a goalkeeper and turned to him.

Coach Cornel Dragusin noticed his skillfulness, proposing him to join the youth team Progresul-București in the group where I. Kluge was (he was 14 at that time) and he never gave up the ball since then.

Sportul Studenţesc
As Manta left high school to enter the Polytechnic University Faculty of Material Science and Engineering in 1961, he left Progresul-București and joined the Sportul Studenţesc (known at that time as "Stiinta București"). In the gym halls from "Regie", he played under the coaches St. Miu and M. Maksay and also alongside Mircea Lucescu.

Progresul București
Manta made his debut with Progresul on 1 October 1967, against Dinamo Bacau which Progresul lost 3–1, under the coaching of Penita Moldoveanu, Florin Stirbei and Cornel Dragusin.

During the period spent in the Cotroceni team, Manta played under the coaches, V. Stanculescu, Al. Karikas and L. Colceriu. His teammates included Mircea Sandu and Gabi Raksi. With Progresul București, he played three seasons in Division A and two seasons in Division B.

Universitatea Craiova
In 1972, Coaches Constantin Cernaianu and Constantin Otet wanted him in Universitatea Craiova team where Manta played for two years, winning second place in the 1972–73 season, and first place in the 1973–1974 season.

Progresul București
In the summer of 1974, Manta returned to Progresul București, under the coaching of Viorel Mateianu and Dumitru Baboia.

Tehnometal București
In 1975–77, Manta joined "Tehnometal București", the team that advanced in the 1975–76 season in Division B.

Non football career
After retirement from his playing career, Manta started his career as a metallurgic engineer at Tehnometal Bucharest factory.

Education
Manta graduated from Polytechnic University Faculty of Material Science and Engineering with a degree in Material Science and Engineering.

Honours
Progresul București
Liga II: 1969–70
Universitatea Craiova
Liga I: 1973–74

External links

1943 births
Footballers from Bucharest
Romanian footballers
Living people
FC Sportul Studențesc București players
FC Progresul București players
CS Universitatea Craiova players
Association football goalkeepers